Socond is a commune of 2,630 inhabitants situated in Satu Mare County, Romania. It is composed of five villages: Cuța (Laphegy), Hodișa (Béltekhodos), Socond, Soconzel (Kisszokond) and Stâna (Felsőboldád).

References

Communes in Satu Mare County